Embleton is a hamlet, township and former chapelry, in County Durham, in England, as well as the site of a medieval village and manor. The township was historically named "Elmdene", supposedly derived from the site's proximity to a woodland of elm trees which, at an earlier time, flourished in the bordering dene. A single farmstead now occupies the site which lies adjacent to the ruins of a small church (originally a manorial chapel of ease) dedicated to the Virgin Mary.

From the 13th to the mid 16th century the manor was the seat of the Elmeden family who assumed the local name. The village was one of nearly 1,500 medieval villages to be abandoned in the 14th century after the collapse of the demesne system of land management. It afterwards passed in the female line to the Bulmers and Smythes and in the 18th century to the Tempests of Wynyard, ancestors of the Marquesses of Londonderry.

Embleton Tower is a Grade I listed Peel tower in the village, which previously incorporated the vicarage.

References

Further reading

 
 

Villages in County Durham